Mian Dasht (also Romanized as Mīān Dasht; also known as Chāh-e Moshk, Chāh Mūshī (Persian: چاه موشي), Chāh Mūshī-ye ‘Olyā, Chāh Mushki, and Chā Mūshī) is a village in Darvahi Rural District, Ab Pakhsh District, Dashtestan County, Bushehr Province, Iran. At the 2006 census, its population was 936, in 182 families.

References 

Populated places in Dashtestan County